Baron Churchill or Lord Churchill may refer to:

 Lord Churchill of Eyemouth (Peerage of Scotland), created in 1682 for John Churchill, 1st Duke of Marlborough, and extinct 1722
 Baron Churchill of Sandridge (Peerage of England), created in 1685 for John Churchill and extant as subsidiary title of Duke of Marlborough
 Baron Churchill (Peerage of the United Kingdom), created in 1815 for Francis Spencer, 1st Baron Churchill, and currently extant